This is a list of hospitals and health care institutions in the Ashanti Region of Ghana.

Structure
The Ashanti Region has 530 health facilities.  170 of these health facilities are operated by the Ghana Health Service; 71  by missions; 281 by private institutions; and 8 by the Ashanti quasi-government. The Ashanti monarchy operates about 32 percent of all health facilities in the Ashanti Region.

Ashanti Region hospitals

Kumasi hospitals and health facilities

The Ashanti capital Kumasi metropolis has the highest number of health facilities in Ashanti region at 38% and Kumasi has a teaching hospital to support the medical training at the Kwame Nkrumah University of Science and Technology (Komfo Anokye Teaching Hospital), the West End Hospital, several other private hospitals, public clinics and small hospitals.

See also

 Architecture of Africa
 Healthcare in Ghana
 List of hospitals in Ghana

References

Hospitals

Hospitals in Ashanti
Hospitals in the Ashanti Regions